Daniel Raúl Arévalo Gallegos (born 21 May 1962) is a Mexican politician affiliated with the Institutional Revolutionary Party. As of 2014 he served as Deputy of the LIX Legislature of the Mexican Congress as a plurinominal representative replacing Roberto Campa.

References

1962 births
Living people
Politicians from Mexico City
Members of the Chamber of Deputies (Mexico)
Institutional Revolutionary Party politicians
Deputies of the LIX Legislature of Mexico